The Narromine News was a newspaper published bi-weekly in Narromine, New South Wales, Australia. It was published as the Narromine News and Trangie Advocate from 1896 to 1979 when its name was changed to the Narromine News.

History
The Narromine News and Trangie Advocate was first published in 1896 by Clifford Stanford Harry Bulstrode Whitelocke. It ceased publication on Wednesday, 25 July 1979, and was continued by The Narromine News, published by Narromine News. The paper was circulated across Narromine, Trangie, Nevertire, Tottenham, and Tomingley.

The Narromine News was one of the print mastheads owned by Australian Community Media included in an announcement "that the company would temporarily suspend the print editions (of) non-daily newspapers" in mid-April of 2020. The print edition ceased, however the company continues to maintain an online news website under the same masthead.

Digitisation
Part of this paper has been digitised as part of the Australian Newspapers Digitisation Program project of the National Library of Australia.

See also
 List of newspapers in Australia
 List of newspapers in New South Wales

References

External links
 Official website
 

Newspapers published in New South Wales
Newspapers on Trove